Voyage to the Planet of Prehistoric Women is a 1968 American science fiction film, one of two films whose footage was taken from the 1962 Soviet SF film Planeta Bur (Planet of Storms) for producer Roger Corman. The original film was scripted by Alexander Kazantsev from his novel and directed by Pavel Klushantsev. This adaptation, made by Peter Bogdanovich, who chose not to have his name credited on the film, included new scenes added that starred Mamie Van Doren. The film apparently had at least a limited U.S. release through American International Pictures, but became better known via subsequent cable TV showings and home video sales. The film contains no footage from Planeta Bur that was not used in the earlier Voyage to the Prehistoric Planet (1965).

Plot
Astronauts landing on Venus kill a flying creature that resembles a pterosaur, which is worshiped as a god by the local blonde Venusian women. They attempt to kill the astronauts by means of their superhuman powers, but ultimately fail. The astronauts eventually escape from Venus, and their abandoned robot, damaged in a flow of volcanic mud and ultimately shut down by the humans for their survival, becomes, in a surprise plot twist ending, the women's new god.

Cast

Venus women
 Mamie Van Doren as Moana
 Mary Marr as Verba
 Paige Lee as Twyla
 Judy Cowart
 Margot Hartman as Mayaway
 Irene Orton as Meriama
 Pam Helton as Wearie
 Frankie Smith as woman of Venus
 Robin Smith
 Adele Valentine

Earth men
 Aldo Romani as Astronaut Andre Freneau
 James David  as Capt. Alfred Kern
 Roberto Martelli (Vladimir Yemelyanov) as Capt. William Lockhart
 Ralph Phillips (Yuri Sarantsev) as Astronaut Howard Sherman
 Murray Gerard (Georgiy Zhzhonov) as Astronaut Hans Walters
 Robot John

Production
The film was known at one stage as Gill Men.

It was the last film made by the Filmgroup company.

Of the production, Bogdanovich has stated:
[Planeta Bur] was a Russian science-fiction film that Roger [Corman] had called Storm Clouds of Venus that he had dubbed into English. And he came to me and said, "Would you shoot some footage with some girls? AIP won't buy it unless we stick some girls in it". So I figured out a way to work some girls in it and shot for five days, and we cut it in. I narrated it, because nobody could make heads or tails of it. Roger wouldn't let me add any sound. It was just a little cheap thing we did, and people think I directed it when I really only directed 10 minutes of it.

Bogdanovich said he had to paint out the red star on the spaceship, "in every frame. We painted in some obscure symbol that might pass for the National Aeronautics and Space Administration".

Bogdanovich hired Mamie Van Doren and several other blondes to play Venusians "because I thought everyone should be blonde on Venus. I dressed them up in rubber suits, bottoms only and put shells over their breasts. I had them traipsing around Leo Carrillo Beach for a while shooting inserts that might relate to Venus". Bogdanovich says he gave the female characters "South Sea movie names" because "it seemed right".

One of the actresses was afraid of sharks and when she was in the water they threw her a rubber fish; she got hysterical, grabbed the fish and bit its head off. He said that people did not understand the film and its new sequences when first cut together, so he added narration. He decided one of the astronauts, "the best looking one", should narrate the film. Bogdanovich wrote the narration and provided the voice, and it was the one credit he took on the film.

Bogdanovich also stated he did not claim credit as director, because "such a small piece of it is mine", although in fact his adaptation of the Planeta Bur material had much more original material in it than the previous version, made by Curtis Harrington. His then-wife Polly Platt worked on the film as a production designer.

Reception
In a retrospective on Soviet science fiction film, British director Alex Cox compared  this version to the earlier Voyage to the Prehistoric Planet and called Voyage to the Planet of Prehistoric Women "equally classic". Although the film review website FilmFanatic.org describes it as "a jarring mish-mosh of scenes" and "frightfully sub-par," it also claims  "the storyline moves along at a quick enough pace that you’ll likely never be bored". Nigel Honeybone of HorrorNews.Net wrote that the film's scenes with Mamie Van Doren represented "Peter Bogdanovich’s stag film", and that producer Roger Corman had "made the Russian footage crappier, fulfilling his patriotic duty as an American".

See also
 Voyage to the Prehistoric Planet, the other film which Roger Corman had made from Planeta Bur
 List of American films of 1968
 List of films featuring extraterrestrials
 List of films in the public domain in the United States

References

External links
 
 
 

1968 films
1968 independent films
1960s science fiction adventure films
American exploitation films
American independent films
American International Pictures films
American science fiction adventure films
American space adventure films
1960s English-language films
Films about astronauts
Films about extraterrestrial life
Films directed by Peter Bogdanovich
Films set in 1998
Films set in the future
Films involved in plagiarism controversies
Prehistoric people in popular culture
Venus in film
1960s exploitation films
1968 directorial debut films
Films produced by Roger Corman
1960s American films